The 2017 season is Persija's 84th competitive season. Along with Liga 1, the club will compete in cup tournaments which yet to be announced. The season covers the period from 1 January 2017 to 31 December 2017.

Month by month review

Before the season begins, Persija Jakarta had followed the preseason tournament, the President Cup. Different from the previous year, now the club dubbed "Macan Kemayoran" it failed to achieve the preseason title for the second time.

Coaching staff

Other Information

|-

|}

Squad information

First-team squad

New contracts

Transfers

In

Out

Loan In

Loan Out

Pre-season

Friendly Matches

2017 Bhayangkara Trofeo Cup

2017 Indonesia President's Cup

Group stage

2017 Cilacap Cup

Competitions

Overview 

{| class="wikitable" style="text-align: center"
|-
!rowspan=2|Competition
!colspan=8|Record
!rowspan=2|Started round
!rowspan=2|Final position / round
!rowspan=2|First match	
!rowspan=2|Last match
|-
!
!
!
!
!
!
!
!
|-
| Liga 1

| —
| 4th
| 15 April 2017
| 12 November 2017
|-
! Total

Liga 1

League table

Results summary

Results by matchday

Matches

First round

Second Round

Notes:

Statistics

Appearances

Top scorers
The list is sorted by shirt number when total goals are equal.

Top assist
The list is sorted by shirt number when total assists are equal.

Clean sheets
The list is sorted by shirt number when total clean sheets are equal.

Top 10 Attendances

(*) Time in Western Indonesia Time (UTC +7)

Summary

References

Persija Jakarta
Persija Jakarta seasons